Freemans Reach is a town in New South Wales, Australia. Freemans Reach is located 65 kilometres north-west of Sydney in the local government area of the City of Hawkesbury. It is bounded in the south by the Hawkesbury River.

Population
In the 2016 Census, there were 1,973 people in Freemans Reach. 84.4% of people were born in Australia and 88.5% of people spoke only English at home, with the most common ancestries being  Australian 31.5%, English 27.6%, Maltese 9.0%, Irish 8.0% and Scottish 6.2%. The most common responses for religion were Catholic 32.2%, Anglican 24.8% and No Religion 23.7%.

References

Suburbs of Sydney
City of Hawkesbury
Hawkesbury River